Embree is a surname, and may refer to:

 Alan Embree (born 1970), middle relief pitcher
 Edwin Embree (1883–1950), American historian and author
 Elihu Embree (1782–1820), abolitionist
 Elijah Embree Hoss (1849–1919), American bishop
 Elisha Embree (1801–1863), American politician from Indiana
 John Embree (1908–1950), anthropologist
 Jon Embree (born 1965),  American football coach
 Mark Embree, professor of numerical analysis
Places:
 Embree, Newfoundland and Labrador
 Embree, Texas